Bragging rights is the prerogative to praise oneself for an accomplishment or for possession of a superior characteristic.

Bragging Rights may also refer to:

WWE Bragging Rights, a professional wrestling event
No Bragging Rights, an American melodic hardcore band
Braggin' Rights, men's college basketball contest
Bragging Rights!, an American game show
Floyd Mayweather Jr. vs. Logan Paul, a boxing exhibition match which has a billed name